"Hand in Hand" is a song performed by Austrian singer-songwriter and radio presenter Julian Le Play. The song was released as a digital download on 18 March 2016 as the lead single from his third studio album Zugvögel (2016). The song peaked at number 14 on the Austrian Singles Chart.

Music video
A music video to accompany the release of "Hand in Hand" was first released onto YouTube on 18 March 2016 at a total length of three minutes and thirty-two seconds.

Track listing

Chart performance

Release history

References

2016 songs
2016 singles
Julian Le Play songs